The World Hindu Economic Forum (WHEF) is a nonprofit, based in Delhi, India. It describes itself as an independent international organization committed to make Hindu society prosperous through creation and sharing of surplus wealth. The forum brings together eminent Hindu intellectuals and businesses for the purposes of collaboration. The organization holds an annual international conference and several regional conferences in different parts of the world.
Dr Sriprakash Kothari, was named as the chairperson of the second World Hindu Congress

Introduction

The WHEF seeks to bring together financially successful individuals from the Hindu Society, such as traders, bankers, technocrats, investors, industrialists, businessmen, professionals, economists, and thinkers under one roof so that each group can share their business knowledge, experience, and expertise with their fellow brethren to make them understand the principles of surplus wealth generation to make society prosperous.

History

The forum was founded by Shri Swami Vigyananand, an Alumnus of the Indian Institute of Technology Kharagpur. He says "We are now living in the 21st century, equipped with all the advanced technologies like airplane, internet, mobiles, and other modern facilities. When we go back in time to recollect the age of torture, destruction, suppression and humiliation that our forefathers underwent, we should derive inspiration from the fact that when our ancestors worked and survived in such difficult times and conditions, so what stops us from excelling in these technologically advanced times?"

International Events

New Delhi, Bharat 2014

Third Annual conference of World Hindu Economic Forum was held at New Delhi with theme "Thriving Economy, Prospering Economy". WHEF 2014 was one of the 7 parallel conferences of first ever World Hindu Congress being organized at New Delhi during 21–23 November 2014.  Around 1800 delegates from 53 countries joined the 3-day event. As per news papers, top government officials including ministers addressed the event showing full support to this event

Prominent speakers expected are the Dalai Lama, Swami Dayananda Saraswati, Dr. Mohanrao Bhagwat, Sarsanghchalak, Hon’ble Ministers: Shri Nitin Gadkari, Minister of Road Transport and Highways, Smt. Smriti Irani, Minister of Human Resources Development, Smt. Nirmala Sitharaman, Minister of State for Commerce and Industry, Dr. Ashni Singh, Minister of Finance, Republic of Guyana; Eminent Scientists: G.Madhavan Nair, Dr. Vijay Bhatkar, leading educationists: Prof. S.B. Majumdar, Dr. G. Visvanthan, Prof. Kapil Kapoor, Film Makers Priyadarshan and Major Ravi, Popular film actress from South Smt. Sukanya Ramesh also joined and spoke in the event.

Bangkok 2013
The conference was inaugurated by Shri D. Devadas, Member Organising Committee WHEF Bangkok, 2013; Shri Susheel Saraff, Chairman, Organising Committee WHEF 2013, Bangkok; Shri Arun Kumar Bajaj, Convener, WHEF Steering Committee; Dr. Gautam Sen, Member, WHEF Steering Committee, Retired Lecturer of London School of Economics & Political Science; H. E. Shri Anil Wadhwa, Ambassador of Bharat of Thailand; H. E. Dr. Olarn Chaipravat, President of the Thailand Trade Representative & Former Deputy Prime Minister of Thailand.
H. E. Dr. Olarn Chaipravat welcomed all the delegates on behalf of the Prime Minister of Thailand and the Royal Thai Government.  7 different sessions were conducted. The sessions included discussions on topics like Emerging opportunities & challenges from free trade agreement, regional economic communities & new geographical areas, Keynote Speeches from Businesses & Industries, Enormous opportunities of business in alternative energy and so on. The sessions were chaired by genius minds like Prof. (Dr.) R. Vaidyanathan, Shri Suresh Prabhu, Prof. (Dr.) Guna Magesan. One session was chaired by young and vibrant Kritika Bajaj. This underlined the greater involvement of youth in WHEF and many of its activities. Another such session was conducted by Liza Bhansali, Pritika Sharma & Nitika Sharma which focused on entrepreneurship among today's youth. Amit Srivastava presented the report on World Hindu and Student Conference organized in Bali during 2012. Shri S.V.Anand handed over the first copy of the book 'Global Handbook on Flooring' to Shri L. Gopakumar and Shri Vinod Kumar to mark the book's release. The conference united most of the influential personalities in the field of economy and business and led to lot of knowledge exchange. This catalyzed the efforts of strengthening economy.

Hong Kong 2012
The World Hindu Economic Forum for South East Asia was conducted at Hong Kong, in the year 2012. Over 250 prominent businesspersons, industrialists, economists, bankers, international traders and business association leaders attended the meet from different countries from Europe, Asia, Africa and Pacific region. Four panels, namely: successful models: Making small & medium-sized enterprise successful in Global Market place, Developing Hindu Economy, Mega trends in global economy & prospects of Bharat's economy and Mantra for Successful Business Enterprise, were designed to discuss nuances of economy & business. The conference was inaugurated by Hon. Shri Anil Kumar Bachoo, Dr Subramanian Swamy, Dr. Gautam Sen, Dr. G. Madhavan Nair, Prof. (Dr.) R. Vaidyanathan, Dr. Vijay P. Bhatkar, Shri Subhash Thakrar, Dr. Dilip N. Kulkarni. All that is crucial for a progressive economy ranging from Infrastructure, Transport & Natural Resources, Global Challenges and opportunities, Development of Aerospace Technology & Economic Opportunity, research & development in the field of science & technology, social entrepreneurship were discussed. The Discussion covered the welfare of a farmer as well as that of an industrialist. There was a unanimous agreement on the urgent need of importance to give back to the roots of traditional economy.

Regional Events

Regional Forum for Europe – 2012 
The World Hindu Economic Forum – Regional Forum for Europe took place at London Chamber of Commerce and Industry on 4 November 2012. It was conducted at the heart of the European business center. Along with scores of bright young Hindu professionals and businessmen, many prominent Hindu professionals and businessmen also attended the forum. Shri Subhash Thakrar (Member of WHYC Steering Committee), and Shri Anil Puri (Member of Steering Committee), Prof. (Dr.) R. Vaidyanathan, Dr. Gautam Sen, S. V. Anand, Shri Arun Bajaj and Shri Anil Puri share their thoughts at the conference.

Regional Forum for South-East and East Asia – 2013
The World Hindu Economic Forum – Regional Forum for South-East and East Asia was organized in Malaysia from 6–7 January 2013 at the Berjaya Times Square Hotel. Delegates from the ASEAN Countries, Bharat, UK and Fiji graced the conference.

Speakers included Shri Dato J. Jegathesan, Dr. Gautam Sen, Shri S.V. Anand, Shri Arun Bajaj, Prof. (Dr.) R. Vaidyanathan, Prof. (Dr.) Mahendhiran Nair, Shri Shubash Thakrar, Shri Datuk Ramesh Kodammal, Shri Datuk V. Nadarajan, Ms. Suseela Menon, Shri M.S. Subramaniam. A special session was held on strengthening the Hindu economy in Sri Lanka. The session was organized by Shri Datuk B.  Sahadevan, Shri V.K. Regu and other volunteers.

Regional Forum – North America – 2013
The World Hindu Economic Forum for North America took place on 28 April 2013 at Dallas, Texas, which is known to the financial hub of Southern USA. It was the first forum of its kind in North America where Hindu entrepreneurs from across various business domain came together on one platform. Many prominent Hindu businessmen and venture capitalists from Texas and other parts of The USA were present at the forum.
Shri S.V. Anand, Shri Sashi Kejriwal, Shri Nitin Anand, Shri Dayakar Pushkar, Dr. Prakasarao Velagapudi and Shri Rahul Chandra shared their views on this occasion.

The Dallas-based World Hindu Foundation team joined via virtual meeting and provided key inputs on integrating Canadian based businessman with the World Hindu Economic Forum. WHEF looks forward to expanding and integrating more and more Hindu entrepreneurs in the North American Regional chapter into its global fold and plans to conduct more conferences within the US and Canada in near future.

Regional Forum – Pacific – 2013
The World Hindu Economic Forum for pacific (Australia, New Zealand, Fiji and Oceania) was organized in Fiji on 4 May 2013 at The Sheraton Hotel Nadi, with the theme "Making the South Pacific Community Prosperous". The forum was attended by a good number of prominent Hindu Businessmen from Fiji, Australia and New Zealand. The forum was inaugurated by Dr. Neil Sharma, Minister for Health, Government of Fiji. 
Shri Vinod Kumar, Bharat's High Commissioner to Fiji, emphasized on the potential to increase trade between Bharat and Fiji and lauded the effort of WHEF. Shr Jay Dayall emphasized on making the Pacific Hindu Community prosperous in all respects.
Other key people who presented papers at this Forum included Vice-chancellor of Fiji National University, Dr. Ganesh Chand, Chairperson of Fiji Commerce Commission, Dr. Mahendra Reddy, Chair of the Oceania Development Network and Professor of Economics at the University of South pacific, Prof. Biman Prasad.

Workshops on the following topics were organized at the forum:
 Young Hindu Business Leaders
 Developing Entrepreneurship among Women.
Shri Noel Lal and Prof Guna Magesan chaired these sessions.

Regional Forum – South Africa – 2014
The World Hindu Economic Forum for South Africa was hosted by Lotus Chamber of Commerce. The theme of the conference was Making Africa Prosperous. The event was attended by several reputed businessmen and intellectuals from South Africa and neighbouring countries.

Speakers for the events were Shri S.V. Anand, Cllr. James Nxumalo, MEC Michael Mabuyakhulu, Mr. Akash Singh, Shri. Ashok Chowgule, Shri. Sujit S Nair, FRSA, Shri. Arvinda Rao, Shri MK Angajan, Ms. Prasheen Singh, Ms. Fawzia Peer, Dr. Suren Pillay, Ms. Sulosh Pillay, and Dr. Anil Sooklal.

Members discussed Trading opportunities in Africa and how it can be used to make overall Africa prosperous.

References

External links
 
 "1st World Hindu Economic Forum – Hong Kong"
 "World Hindu Economic Forum 2013, Bangkok"
 "World Hindu Economic Forum – Dallas, USA"

20th-century economic history
21st-century economic history
Global economic conferences
Business organisations based in India